The Expanded Program on Immunization is a World Health Organization program with the goal to make vaccines available to all children.

History 

The World Health Organization (WHO) initiated the Expanded Program on Immunization (EPI) in May 1974 with the objective to vaccinate children throughout the world. 

Ten years later, in 1984, the WHO established a standardized vaccination schedule for the EPI vaccines: Bacillus Calmette-Guérin (BCG), diphtheria-tetanus-pertussis (DTP), oral polio, and measles. Increased knowledge of the immunologic factors of disease led to new vaccines being developed and added to the EPI’s list of recommended vaccines: Hepatitis B (HepB), yellow fever in countries endemic for the disease, and Haemophilus influenzae meningitis (Hib) conjugate vaccine in countries with high burden of disease.

In 1999, the Global Alliance for Vaccines and Immunization (GAVI) was created with the sole purpose of improving child health in the poorest countries by extending the reach of the EPI. The GAVI brought together a grand coalition, including the UN agencies and institutions (WHO, UNICEF, the World Bank), public health institutes, donor and implementing countries, the Bill and Melinda Gates Foundation and The Rockefeller Foundation, the vaccine industry, non-governmental organizations (NGOs) and many more. The creation of the GAVI has helped to renew interest and maintain the importance of immunizations in battling the world’s large burden of infectious diseases.

These are the goals:
 to ensure full immunization of children under one year of age in every district, 
 to globally eradicate poliomyelitis, 
 to reduce maternal and neonatal tetanus to an incidence rate of less than one case per 1,000 births by 2005, 
 to cut in half the number of measles-related deaths that occurred in 1999, and 
 to extend all new vaccine and preventative health interventions to children in all districts in the world.  

In addition, the GAVI has set up specific milestones to achieve the EPI goals: that by 2010 all countries have routine immunization coverage of 90% of their child population, that HepB be introduced in 80% of all countries by 2007, and that 50% of the poorest countries have Hib vaccine by 2005.

We can also mention the act of Guillaume Ngoie Mwamba, Director of the Expanded  Program on Immunization in 2018, is the first person to receive the Ebola vaccine in Mbandaka, Democratic Republic of Congo on May 22, 2018.

Implementation 

In each of the United Nations’ member states, the national governments create and implement their policies for vaccination programs following the guidelines set by the EPI. Setting up an immunization program is multifaceted and contains many complex components including a reliable cold chain system, transport for the delivery of the vaccines, maintenance of vaccine stocks, training and monitoring of health workers, outreach educational programs to inform the public, and a means of documenting and recording which child receives which vaccines. 

Each region has slightly varying ways of setting up and implementing their immunization programs based on their level of health infrastructure. 

Some areas will have fixed sites for vaccination: health care facilities such as hospitals or health posts that include vaccination with many other health care activities. But in areas where the number of structured health facilities is small, mobile vaccination teams consisting of staff members from a health facility can deliver vaccines straight to individual towns and villages. These ‘outreach’ services are often scheduled throughout the year. However, in especially under-developed countries where proper communication and infrastructure is absent, cancellation of the planned immunization visits leads to deterioration of the program. A better strategy in such countries is the ‘pulse immunization’ technique, where ‘pulses’ of vaccines are given to children in annual vaccination campaigns.

Additional strategies are needed if the area of the program consists of poor urban communities because such areas tend to have low uptake of vaccination programs. Door-to-door canvassing, also referred to as channeling, is used to increase uptake in such hard to reach groups. Finally, periodic national-level mass vaccination campaigns are being increasingly included in the programs.

Evaluation 

In each country, immunization programs are monitored using two methods: an administrative method and through community-based surveys. The administrative method uses immunization data from public, private, and NGO clinics. Thus, the accuracy of the administrative method is limited by the availability and accuracy of reports from these facilities. This method is easily performed in areas where government services deliver the immunizations directly or where the government supplies the vaccines to the clinics. In countries without the infrastructure to do this, community-based surveys are used to estimate immunization coverage.

Community-based surveys are applied using a modified cluster sampling survey method developed by the World Health Organization. Vaccine coverage is evaluated using a two-stage sampling approach in which 30 clusters and seven children in each cluster are selected. Health care workers with no or limited background in statistics and sampling are able to carry out data collection with minimal training. Such a survey implementation provides a way to get information from areas where there is no reliable data source. It is also used to validate reported vaccine coverage (for example, from administrative reports) and is expected to estimate vaccine coverage within 10 percent.

Surveys or questionnaires, though frequently considered inaccurate due to self-reporting, can provide more detailed information than administrative reports alone. If home-based records are available, vaccination status be determined and dates of vaccination can be reviewed to determine if they were given at an ideal age and in appropriate intervals. Missed immunizations can be identified and further qualified. Importantly, systems of vaccine delivery besides clinics used for administrative evaluation can be identified and included in the analysis.

Results 

Before the initiation of the EPI, child vaccination coverage for tuberculosis, diphtheria, pertussis, tetanus, polio and measles was estimated to be fewer than 5 percent. Now, not only has coverage increased to 79 percent, it has been expanded to include vaccinations for hepatitis B, Haemophilus influenzae type B, rubella, tetanus, and yellow fever. The impact of increased vaccination is clear from the decreasing incidence of many diseases. For example, measles deaths decreased by 60% worldwide between 1999 and 2005, and polio, although missing the goal of eradication by 2005, has decreased significantly as there were fewer than 2,000 cases in 2006.

References

External links 
 Global Immunization Coverage
 WHO UNICEF coverage estimates
World Health Organization